In computational chemistry, spin contamination is the artificial mixing of different electronic spin-states. This can occur when an approximate orbital-based wave function is represented in an unrestricted form – that is, when the spatial parts of α and β spin-orbitals are permitted to differ. Approximate wave functions with a high degree of spin contamination are undesirable. In particular, they are not eigenfunctions of the total spin-squared operator, Ŝ2, but can formally be expanded in terms of pure spin states of higher multiplicities (the contaminants).

Open-shell wave functions 

Within Hartree–Fock theory, the wave function is approximated as a Slater determinant of spin-orbitals. For an open-shell system, the mean-field approach of Hartree–Fock theory gives rise to different equations for the α and β orbitals. Consequently, there are two approaches that can be taken – either to force double occupation of the lowest orbitals by constraining the α and β spatial distributions to be the same (restricted open-shell Hartree–Fock, ROHF) or permit complete variational freedom (unrestricted Hartree–Fock UHF). In general, an N-electron  Hartree–Fock wave function composed of Nα α-spin orbitals and Nβ β-spin orbitals can be written as

where  is the antisymmetrization operator. This wave function is an eigenfunction of the total spin projection operator, Ŝz, with eigenvalue (Nα − Nβ)/2 (assuming Nα ≥ Nβ). For a ROHF wave function, the first 2Nβ spin-orbitals are forced to have the same spatial distribution:

There is no such constraint in an UHF approach.

Contamination 

The total spin-squared operator commutates with the nonrelativistic molecular Hamiltonian so it is desirable that any approximate wave function is an eigenfunction of Ŝ2. The eigenvalues of Ŝ2 are S(S + 1) where S can take the values 0 (singlet), 1/2 (doublet), 1 (triplet), 3/2 (quartet), and so forth.

The ROHF wave function is an eigenfunction of Ŝ2: the expectation value Ŝ2 for a ROHF wave function is

However, the UHF wave function is not: the expectation value of Ŝ2 for an UHF wave function is

The sum of the last two terms is a measure of the extent of spin contamination in the unrestricted Hartree–Fock approach and is always non-negative – the wave function is usually contaminated to some extent by higher order spin eigenstates unless a ROHF approach is taken.  Naturally, there is no contamination if all electrons are the same spin.  Also, there
is often no contamination if the number of α and β electrons is the same.  A small basis set could also constrain the
wavefunction sufficiently to prevent spin contamination.

Such contamination is a manifestation of the different treatment of α and β electrons that would otherwise occupy the same molecular orbital. It is also present in Møller–Plesset perturbation theory calculations that employ an unrestricted wave function as a reference state (and even some that employ a restricted wave function) and, to a much lesser extent, in the unrestricted Kohn–Sham approach to density functional theory using approximate exchange-correlation functionals.

Elimination 

Although the ROHF approach does not suffer from spin contamination, it is less commonly available in quantum chemistry computer programs. Given this, several approaches to remove or minimize spin contamination from UHF wave functions have been proposed.

The annihilated UHF (AUHF) approach involves the annihilation of first spin contaminant of the density matrix at each step in the self-consistent solution of the Hartree–Fock equations using a state-specific Löwdin annihilator. The resulting wave function, while not completely free of contamination, dramatically improves upon the UHF approach especially in the absence of high order contamination.

Projected UHF (PUHF) annihilates all spin contaminants from the self-consistent UHF wave function. The projected energy is evaluated as the expectation of the projected wave function.

The spin-constrained UHF (SUHF) introduces a constraint into the Hartree–Fock equations of the form λ(Ŝ2 − S(S + 1)), which as λ tends to infinity reproduces the ROHF solution.

All of these approaches are readily applicable to unrestricted Møller–Plesset perturbation theory.

Density functional theory 
Although many density functional theory (DFT) codes simply calculate spin-contamination using the Kohn–Sham orbitals as if they were Hartree–Fock orbitals, this is not necessarily correct.

References 

Computational chemistry
Quantum chemistry